Mayumi Yamamoto may refer to:

Mayumi Yamamoto (actress) (born 1984), Japanese actress
Mayumi Yamamoto (speed skater) (born 1971), Japanese speed skater
Mayumi Yamamoto (tennis), Japanese tennis player
Mayumi Yamamoto (singer), Japanese singer that went by the stage name CINDY